The Renfrew Hockey Club, also known as the Creamery Kings and the Millionaires, was a founding franchise in 1909 of the National Hockey Association, the precursor to the National Hockey League. The team was based in the founder Ambrose O'Brien's hometown of Renfrew, Ontario.

History
The team's founder, Ambrose O'Brien had played varsity hockey at the University of Toronto, then continued his interest as a team founder and owner, financed by his father's amassed great wealth during the Cobalt silver rush –mining magnate Senator M. J. O'Brien. 

In 1909, when O'Brien sought to join the new Canadian Hockey Association with his existing Renfrew team in the semi-pro Federal Hockey League, the application was rejected.  With fellow rejectee Montreal Wanderers, O'Brien founded the NHA, along with franchises in Cobalt, Haileybury and Montreal.

With O'Brien Silver Mine money backing the Creamery Kings, Renfrew iced a powerful team during its first season, with players Frank Patrick and Lester Patrick commanding salaries of $3,000 each, and Cyclone Taylor receiving a record-setting $5,250 for a two-month season. 

In consequence, the team became widely nicknamed the "Millionaires" for the over the top salaries. O'Brien also secured the services of Newsy Lalonde midseason from the Canadiens franchise, and Lalonde would wind up the season as NHA's first scoring champion.  Coached by Ottawa Senators legend and future Hall of Famer Alf Smith, Renfrew finished in third place in the 1910 season with an 8-3-1 record. The team had been held as a favorite to win the Stanley Cup at the onset of the season, and at the end of the season Ottawa Senators player Bruce Stuart claimed lack of confidence played a role in the missed opportunity:

Its second and final season, Renfrew lost Lalonde to the new Montreal Canadiens team, and finished with a less than stellar 8-8 record, with Don Smith and Odie Cleghorn being the leading scorers.  Renfrew's final major professional game was a 7-6 victory on March 7, 1911, against the Wanderers.

Thereafter, with it being apparent that the small towns such as Renfrew, Cobalt and Haileybury could not support major senior hockey, O'Brien folded the franchise for good.

Renfrew Arena

The team's first arena was their only home and lasted until a fire in the late 1920s destroyed it. A second arena called simply Renfrew Arena or Old Barn was completed in 1929.

Hall of Famers
Newsy Lalonde C
Lester Patrick D
Frank Patrick D
Didier Pitre F/D
Alf Smith RW
Frederick Wellington "Cyclone" Taylor
Sprague Cleghorn  D

See also
 Renfrew Timberwolves
 Cobalt Silver Kings
 Haileybury Comets

References

Notes

General
 Coleman, Charles L. Trail of the Stanley Cup, Vol I., NHL, 1966.
 Cosentino, Frank. The Renfrew Creamery Kings: The Valley Boys of Winter 1910. Burnstown, Ontario: General Store Publishing House, 1990.

External links

 Historical plaque in Renfrew

1909 establishments in Ontario
1911 disestablishments in Ontario
Defunct ice hockey teams in Canada
Ice hockey clubs established in 1909
Ice hockey teams in Ontario
National Hockey Association teams
Renfrew County
Sports clubs disestablished in 1911